The Archibald Smith Plantation Home is a historic house in Roswell, Georgia, built in 1845. The home was built by one of Roswell's founders, Archibald Smith, and housed three generations of his family.

Background
The home was restored by the third generation, Arthur and Mary Smith, in 1940. The home was sold to the City of Roswell in 1986 and opened to the public as a house museum in 1991.

In addition to the home, the grounds include a guest house, slave quarters, cookhouse, carriage house, barn, spring house and water well. The plantation was added to the National Register of Historic Places in 2006.

References

External links

Official Archibald Smith Home website

Antebellum architecture
Houses completed in 1845
Roswell, Georgia
Houses on the National Register of Historic Places in Georgia (U.S. state)
Georgian architecture in Georgia (U.S. state)
Plantation houses in Georgia (U.S. state)
Historic house museums in Georgia (U.S. state)
Farm museums in Georgia (U.S. state)
Museums in Fulton County, Georgia
Tourist attractions in Roswell, Georgia
National Register of Historic Places in Roswell, Georgia
Houses in Fulton County, Georgia
Historic districts on the National Register of Historic Places in Georgia (U.S. state)
Slave cabins and quarters in the United States